Smith Township is one of ten townships in Posey County, Indiana, USA. At the 2000 census, its population was 1,292.

History
Smith Township was organized in 1817. The township was named for George Smith, a pioneer settler.

Adjacent townships
 Posey County
 Center Township
 Robb Township
 Robinson Township
 Gibson County
 Johnson Township
 Montgomery Township
 Vanderburgh County
 Armstrong Township

Towns
Cynthiana

References

External links
Indiana Township Association
United Township Association of Indiana

Townships in Posey County, Indiana
Townships in Indiana